László Melis (14 August 1953 – 12 February 2018) was a Hungarian composer and violinist. He writes primarily in the minimal style and his compositions are often characterized by a propulsive, bouncy quality. Melis was a founding member of the Hungarian new music group Group 180, which during its existence (1978–1990) performed and recorded five of his compositions.

Melis has composed music for film, winning the Award for Best Music for his work in the animated pieces, A szél ("The Wind") and Gyurmatek ("Clay Play") at the 2nd Kecskemét Animation Film Festival. He composed the score for the award-winning film Son of Saul. He has also worked extensively in theater, creating incidental music for theatrical productions. His compositions have been recorded by the BMC and Hungaroton labels.

References

External links
László Melis page at Budapest Music Center site

1953 births
2018 deaths
20th-century classical composers
21st-century classical composers
Hungarian classical composers
Hungarian male classical composers
20th-century Hungarian male musicians
21st-century Hungarian male musicians
Musicians from Budapest